Porthmadog (WHHR) railway station is the southern terminus of the Welsh Highland Heritage Railway and serves the western end of the town of Porthmadog in Gwynedd, Wales. It is situated opposite the Porthmadog National Rail station. The station opened on 2 August 1980 and was originally a simple wooden shed situated in the car park. In January 1986 a portable building was installed at the end of the platforms for use as a waiting room and café.

In 1990 a permanent station building was built between the café and the buffer stops. Initially it replaced the wooden shed and was subsequently extended to the east in 1993 to double the size of the shop.

The old café was demolished in 1998 and the station building was extended over its site. The station building was built by volunteers and is a single-storey building with a pitched roof and canopy.

During the 1998 Civil's week the 50 lb run round point was replaced with a 75 lb full lead allowing a short siding to be constructed adjacent to the headshunt. This siding is now used to store various historic wagons, considerably enhancing the period feel of the station. The run round loop was relaid in 75 lb rail the same week.

See also 
Porthmadog Network Rail station
Porthmadog Harbour (FR) station

External links
Porthmadog Station webcam

|-
|colspan=5|Walking connection with Porthmadog Harbour on the Welsh Highland & Ffestiniog Railways

|-
|colspan=5|Walk Connection with Porthmadog on the Cambrian Coast Line.

Heritage railway stations in Gwynedd
Welsh Highland Railway
Railway stations in Great Britain opened in 1980
Railway stations built for UK heritage railways
Porthmadog